Minnesota Golden Gophers gymnastics refers to one of the following:
Minnesota Golden Gophers men's gymnastics
Minnesota Golden Gophers women's gymnastics